Sagina  maritima is a species of flowering plant in the family Caryophyllaceae known by the common name sea pearlwort. It is found throughout Europe, Southwest Asia, North Africa, the Canary Islands and the Azores.

Gallery

References

maritima